Ara-Köl (or Ara-Kel, Arakol) is a village in Cholpon rural community of Kochkor District of Naryn Region of Kyrgyzstan. Its population was 1,028 in 2021.

References
 

Populated places in Naryn Region